HONR Network is an American 501(c)(3) nonprofit organization that was founded in 2014 by Lenny Pozner. The organization began as an advocate for the survivors and the victims of mass casualty, and highly publicized, violent incidents, who were revictimized online by conspiracy theorists. More recently, HONR's mission has expanded to assist all victims of online hate and harassment and it has been involved in bringing about significant policy changes at Facebook, WordPress YouTube and other major online platforms.

History
On Friday, December 14, 2012, Lenny Pozner's six-year-old-son Noah became the youngest victim of the Sandy Hook Elementary School massacre, when a lone gunman entered the school in Newtown, Connecticut and opened fire, killing twenty children and six educators.

Almost immediately after the shooting, conspiracy theorists began claiming that the event was staged by the US government in order to generate sympathy and justification for a drastic ban on guns and a destruction of the Second Amendment. They claimed that no one died at Sandy Hook Elementary and that the families of victims and first responders were crisis actors. As the youngest victim, Noah's photo was frequently used by the media when reporting on the aftermath. Stories on conspiracy theorist's websites, such as Infowars, began claiming that Noah either never existed, or that he was an actor, alive and well, participating in other "false flag" incidents. Because of the news coverage, and the use of Noah's picture globally, conspiracy theorists began focusing on the Pozner family and defacing pictures of Noah that the family had placed on an online memorial page.  Less than a month after the shooting, Noah's mother, Veronique de la Rosa and her brother, attorney Alexis Haller spoke out in the media advocating gun control. The online harassment continued as the conspiracy theorists posted hateful, defamatory, harassing, and anti-Semitic comments, as well as claims that Noah didn't die or even existed.

Some of the harassment was incited by InfoWars host Alex Jones. Seven weeks after the shooting, Pozner emailed Jones and asked "Haven't we had our share of pain and suffering? All these accusations of government involvement, false flag terror, new world order, etc...I feel that your type of show created these hateful people and they need to be reeled in!" InfoWars staff denied that Jones was participating in what Pozner had called "Hoax Theory". In response, Jones told his audience of over 12 million viewers to rise up and "find out the truth".

Pozner attempted to appease the conspiracy theorists by talking with them online, as well as sharing photos of Noah, his birth certificate, school reports and death certificate. His attempts at engaging with these people were largely rejected. These "hoaxers", a term Pozner used to describe conspiracy theorists who believed that mass casualty events were government perpetrated hoaxes, began an intense campaign of harassment, that included stalking, death threats, posting a background report on him, his social security number, and the addresses of Pozner, and his family members, online on various social media platforms. These platforms had long ignored requests by victims of online harassment, merely suggesting that they "flag" or report instances of abuse, that would then be reviewed and potentially removed by platform moderators. A person could only flag a particular piece of content once, and most content that only received a single flag or even a handful of flags was never removed.

By 2014, Pozner had spent more than a year flagging content, and appealing to the social media platforms to remove thousands of defaced pictures of his son and Pozner's own private information, as well as reporting instances of harassment and death threats. Since the massacre, and the online attacks on his family, Pozner had been contacted by sympathetic people, as well as others who had been abused online. "Almost immediately, other victims of online hate and harassment began reaching out to me for advice." Many of these people volunteered to help. Pozner organised these volunteers to help him find and report posts and pictures en masse, and named this group the HONR Network. The name HONR is not an acronym, but instead comes from a web domain name he had owned previously as a professional web developer. He repurposed it to honor Noah and other victims of hoaxer and hate sites.

Mission
The HONR Network's initial aims were to protect survivors and the families of victim of mass casualty events like Sandy Hook, who were being harassed, defamed, tormented, threatened, and intimidated online by hoaxers and hate groups. By using a multitude of methods of reporting harassing content, HONR has become effective at removing online hate. HONR has also assisted social media platforms in creating policies designed to better protect victims of mass casualty and highly publicized, violent incidents. HONR's mission has further expanded to assist all victims of online hate and harassment, regardless of the source and motivations. The organization also works to provide education about online rights and responsibilities and assist social media platforms to craft impactful policy to make the internet a safer place.

Activities
The HONR network has as many as 300 volunteers working to remove defamatory and harassing content from the internet. While all states have anti-harassment laws, not all states equate online stalking, harassment, and defamation with traditional offline offenses. This has meant that for many victims, going to the police or filing a civil suit is ineffective in the removal of harassing content online. HONR volunteers flag and report harassing videos, images, and content en masse to social media platforms and online service providers, often citing invasion of privacy, bullying, hate speech, and copyright infringement.

Facebook
On July 25, 2018, Lenny Pozner issued an open letter to Facebook founder Mark Zuckerberg, in the UK Guardian newspaper. In the letter, Pozner and his ex-wife Veronique de la Rosa blasted Zuckerberg for his protective stance on hate speech and inaction in protecting victims of harassment on the Facebook platform. Pozner called for Facebook to include survivors and the families of victims of mass casualty events in its groups of protected people and provide better removal options for victims of online abuse. For over five years, since the Sandy Hook massacre, Pozner's pleas to Facebook for assistance in removing defamatory content had been ignored. With no stance on protecting victims from conspiracy theorists or other forms of online harassment and despite thousands of requests for the removal of abusive content, Facebook had only acted to remove a small number of pictures of Noah under an unauthorized use of the photo of a minor or copyright violation rule. After the Guardian letter, which was reprinted globally, Facebook officials announced that they had taken steps to recognize victims of mass casualty events as a protected group.

WordPress
While many smaller platforms were responsive to Pozner's requests to remove abusive content, WordPress was the first major platform to take significant action  to remove conspiracy content from the internet, including the unauthorised  publication of the photos of victims. WordPress's parent company Automatic, later enacted a policy against the "malicious publication of unauthorized, identifying images of minors." Additionally, Facebook has enacted policy which recognises the victims of mass casualty events as a protected group. Convincing online platforms to recognise these victims as protected groups has been one of the main aims of the HONR Network.

YouTube
The HONR Network has also brought about significant change in policy at YouTube. In the past, the online video platform has had no policy against conspiracy or hoax theory videos in general. The HONR network continually raised its concerns about this lack of policy with YouTube. In response, in 2017, YouTube clarified that hoax theory videos that targeted the victims or family members of public acts of violence would count as harassment, and could be taken down. "Our hearts go out to the families who have suffered these incredibly tragic losses," a YouTube spokesperson said in an email. "We recognize the challenging issues raised by the victims' families, and that is why we updated the application of our harassment policy last summer. As a result, we have removed hundreds of these videos as they have been flagged to us and we will continue to do so."

In June of 2019, YouTube announced that it would be further changing its official policy in order to combat hate speech. In an official blog post, it announced that it would prohibit and remove videos denying that well-documented, violent events like the Holocaust or the shooting at Sandy Hook Elementary, had taken place. Additionally, it would be removing hate and supremacist content. All told, this meant that hundreds of thousands of videos would now be considered to be in violation of its rules, and would be removed. Speaking about the change in policy, Pozner thanked YouTube for "taking the lead in enacting policy changes that we have been recommending for the past half-decade."

Twitter
While most other major platforms have responded to requests for greater protection for survivors and the families of victims of mass casualty and high-profile violence, Twitter has continued to reject or ignore Pozner's and the HONR Network's appeals. Twitter continues to be the most difficult social media platform to remove any type of harassing and abusive content.

See also 
 Sandy Hook Elementary School shooting
 National Center for Victims of Crime

References

External links
 HONR Network

2014 establishments in Florida
Orlando, Florida
Non-profit organizations based in Florida
501(c)(3) organizations
Crime victim advocates